Les Fous du Stade is a 1972 French comedy film directed by Claude Zidi.

Plot
The foursome (Gérard Rinaldi, Jean Sarrus, Gérard Filipelli, Jean-Guy Fechner) are on a holiday. The Little Olympic flame is to be passed through their village. A grocer (Paul Préboist) calls upon them for help in decorating the village. On their job Gérard falls for the grocer's daughter Délice (Martine Kelly). However she runs away with the sportsman with the flame. The four then enter the Little Olympics to try to win her back and cause havoc in the process.

Cast
 Gérard Rinaldi - Gérard 
 Jean Sarrus - Jean 
 Gérard Filipelli - Phil 
 Jean-Guy Fechner - Jean-Guy 
 Paul Préboist - Jules Lafougasse
 Martine Kelly - Délice
 Gérard Croce - Lucien
 Jacques Seiler - The director of the Cyclists
 Antoine
 Guy Lux : Himself
 Christian Fechner : (Uncredited)

References

External links
 

1972 comedy films
1972 films
Films directed by Claude Zidi
French comedy films
1970s French films